Leah Jacqueline Cooney, known professionally as Haywood (formerly Leah Haywood), is an Australian record producer, songwriter and singer. 

Born in New Zealand, she grew up in Perth, Western Australia, and recorded a top 40 album, Leah, released in 2001 on Epic Records, which contained her Top 10 single, "We Think It's Love". Two more Top 40 hits followed with "Crazy" in 2000 and "Takin' Back What's Mine" in 2001. She also performed backing vocals for Celine Dion on "That's the Way It Is", the 1999 hit single from Dion's album All the Way… A Decade of Song. Haywood's song "Summer of Love" was the theme for Channel Ten Australia at the Start of 2002. She opened for Ricky Martin on the Australian leg of his International tour.

Haywood was nominated as Best Female Artist at the Australian Record Industry Association (ARIA) Music Awards of 2001. "We Think It's Love" was nominated for Most Performed Australian Work at the 2001 Australian Performing Rights Association (APRA) Awards. In 2002, Haywood and husband, Daniel Pringle, relocated to Los Angeles to run Dreamlab, their production and songwriting company.

Biography
Haywood was born in New Zealand, but moved to Perth, Western Australia, at a young age, where she trained on piano and vocals before moving to Sydney by 1999. She signed with Epic Records (Australia) to release her debut single, "We Think It's Love", in February 2000, which peaked at number 7 on the ARIA Singles Chart. Two more Top 40 hits followed with "Crazy" in August and "Takin' Back What's Mine" in April 2001. Her debut album, Leah, followed in July and peaked in the Top 40 on the ARIA Albums Chart.

In 2002, Haywood moved to Los Angeles, California with her husband, Daniel James, and started Dreamlab, a production and songwriting company managed by Advanced Alternative Media Inc.. A discography of songs written, co-written and/or produced by Leah Haywood/Dreamlab may be viewed on the AAM website.

From their Los Angeles studio, Haywood and James, as Dreamlab, co-wrote and co-produced Aly and AJ's debut top 40 single "Rush" and produced eight tracks on the record; which has sold in excess of a million records worldwide. They have worked with actors Emmy Rossum and Keanu Reeves on their respective musical endeavours, and had further releases in 2008, including Epic Records rock band, Automatic Loveletter. Dreamlab co-wrote half the tracks and produced the entire record for Ryan Cabrera. They have printed a limited number of copies of their electronica EP self-titled Dreamlab. An LP version was completed by late 2008.

Also in late 2008, Haywood provided background vocals for the ballad "Out from Under" sung by American pop singer Britney Spears off her sixth studio album, Circus. In 2009, Haywood co-wrote Perth singer Cassie Davis' third single, "Do It Again", and "Pieces", a track on Allison Iraheta's debut album Just Like You, she also wrote "Masquerade" for Ashley Tisdale's second album, Guilty Pleasure .
She is also known to have co-written and produced at least two tracks from Australian singer Amy Pearson's upcoming second studio album Aftershock, and these are the title track "Aftershock" and "Doctor Love".
In 2011, Haywood co-wrote three songs on American singer-songwriter Demi Lovato's third studio album "Unbroken"; "Hold Up", "Mistake" and title track "Unbroken". Also co-wrote "Hit the Lights" by American singer Selena Gomez from When the Sun Goes Down. Leah also co-wrote and co-produced the track "Marilyn Monroe" by American rapper Nicki Minaj from Pink Friday: Roman Reloaded which debuted at number 1 on the Billboard 200.

In 2020, Leah co-wrote "Lovesick Girls" by South Korean girl group Blackpink from their debut studio album, The Album

In March 2021, Leah released her first single in 20 years as an artist under a new stage name Haywood, titled "Cheers To Us" featuring Jackson Foote of American pop duo, Loote. A second single, "Backbeat", was released in June with "Bleeder", the third single, released in August. In April 2022, Leah and her husband were nominated at the 64th Annual Grammy Awards for their work on Justin Bieber's Justice album track, "Off My Face". Leah's second studio album (and first under the "Haywood" stage name), Pressure on My Heart, was released in July 2022.

Discography

Studio albums

Singles

Production and songwriting credits

Awards and nominations

ARIA Music Awards
The ARIA Music Awards is an annual awards ceremony that recognises excellence, innovation, and achievement across all genres of Australian music. They commenced in 1987.

Grammy Awards
The Grammy Awards, or Grammys, are presented annually by the National Academy of Recording Arts and Sciences. The ceremony honors outstanding achievements in the music industry, with awards of the most popular interest presented during the live televised event.

References

External links
Dreamlab Official Myspace
Layer Cake Records Official Website
AAM Management Website

1976 births
Living people
Musicians from Western Australia
Australian people of New Zealand descent
Australian women pop singers
21st-century Australian singers
21st-century Australian women singers